was a Japanese actor. He won the award for best supporting actor at the 9th Hochi Film Award and at the 6th Yokohama Film Festival for Mahjong hōrōki.

Selected filmography

Tekken no machi (1947)
Arabiya monogatari (1951)
Koi no Oranda-zaka (1951) - Night Guard
Inazuma (1952) - Bus driver
Ani imôto (1953)
Shunkin monogatari (1954) - Genkichi
Ashita kuru hito (1955) - Hotel's guide
Haru no yo no dekigoto (1955) - Uomasa
Mittsu no kao (1955)
Zoku keisatsu nikki (1955) - Ishikura
Shiawase wa doko ni (1956)
Chitei no uta (1956) - Tetsu
Ukigusa no yado (1957)
Fukushû wa dare ga yaru (1957) - Hide
'Otoko tai otoko' yori: Inochi mo koi mo (1957) - Shigure no Masa
Kurutta kankei (1957) - Dragon Nishiura
Frankie Bûchan no zoku aa gunkaki: Nyogo ga-shima funsenki (1957)
Kunin no shikeishû (1957) - Kishida
Underworld Beauty (1958) - Ôsawa
Dose hirotta koi da mono (1958) - Guzu-tetsu
Fumihazushita haru (1958) - detective A
Kagenaki koe (1958)
Kanzenna yûgi (1958) - Man at velodrome
Hateshinaki yokubô (1958)
Tokai no dogô (1958)
Gunshû no naka no taiyô (1959) - Yasukawa
Dynamite ni hi o tsukero (1959) - Genkichi Narumi
Zero bângai no ôkami (1959)
Nikaidô Takuya: Ginza Buraichô - Ginza Mite Guy (1959) - Tatsu
Jigoku no magarikado (1959) - Sabu
Fudôtoku kyôiku kôza (1959) - Chief of fire station
Kenju burai-chō Nukiuchino Ryu (1960, part 1, 2) - Gen
Datô - Knock Down (1960) - Ishihara
Jamamono wa kese (1960) - Tôru Yabe
Tokusôhan 5 gô (1960) - Mimura
Kenju buraicho: Denko sekka no otoko (1960)
Mikkô zero rain (1960)
Umi no joji ni kakero (1960) - Mizuno
Ôabare fûraibô (1960) - Sakakibara
Go to Hell, Hoodlums! (1960) - Sanshiro Izeki, clan retainer
Yato! jigoku e ike (1960)
Âru koi monogatari (1960)
Arigataya bushi: ah, arigataya, arigataya (1961)
Umi no shôbushi (1961) - Shimada
Tsuiseki (1961)
Arashi o tsukkiru jetto-ki (1961) - Shirai
Otoko to otoko no ikiru machi (1962) - Miyajima
Sugata naki tsuisekisha (1962)
Ginza no koi no monogatari (1962) - Take-san
Dai hyôgen (1962) - Gorô Isomura
Âoi machi no ôkami (1962)
Hai tiin yakuza (1962) - Detective
Nikui an-chikushô (1962)
Zerosen Kurokumo Ikka (1962)
Hitoribotchi no futari daga (1962) - Satô
Ore ni kaketa yatsura (1962)
Alibi (1963) - Takahashi
Kaze ga yondeiru senbuji - ginza buraicho (1963)
Ginza no Jirochô - Tenka no ichidaiji (1963) - Ôkuma
Ôkami no ôji (1963)
Zokû otoko no monshô (1963)
Kantô mushuku (1963) - Yakami
Akai ka to roku denashi (1963)
Kakedashi keiji (1964) - Muneta
Hana to dotô (1964)
Teigin jiken: Shikeishû (1964)
Our Blood Will Not Forgive (1964) - Hôsaku Katagai
Otoko no monshô - kanka jô (1964)
Tekkaba yaburi (1964)
Shî ni zama o mirû (1964)
Otoko no monsho: hana to nagadosu (1964)
Kenjû yarô (1965)
Story of a Prostitute (1965) - Makita
Seishun to wa nanda (1965) - Uegen
Toba no mesu neko (1965)
Dainippon koroshiya den (1965) - Kumoi
Kaitô X - Kubi no nai otoko (1965)
Tattooed Life (1965) - Tsuneyoshi
Sanbiki no nora înu (1965)
Otoko no monshô ore wa kiru (1965)
Înochi shirazû no roku dênashî (1965)
Gyangû no shôzo (1965)
Ore ni sawaru to abunaize (1966) - Detective Toyama
Toba no mesu neko: sutemi no shôbu (1966)
Chimatsuri kenkajo (1966)
Shin yûkyôden (1966)
Ya zhou mi mi jing tan (1966)
Horo no uta (1966)
Kitaguni no ryojô (1967) - Station master
Hôshiyo nâgekûna: Shorî no otokô (1967)
Yogiri yo Kon'yamo Arigatō (1967) - Senkichi
Shichinin no yajû (1967)
Minagoroshi no kenjû (1967)
Shichinin no yajû: chi no sengen (1967)
Ketto (1967) - Tayan, smith
Wakaoyabun tanjô (1967) - Yakichi
Shin otokono monshô: waka ôyabun tanjô (1967)
Bakudan otoko to iwareru âitsu (1967)
Burai yori daikanbu (1968) - Kyûzô Shimamoto
Burai hijô (1968) - Hashizume
Shikiyoku no hate (1968) - Takagi, a detective
Retaliation (1968) - Isobe
Burai: Kuro dosu (1968) - Igawa
Zankyo mujo (1968) - Roku
Hoshikage no hatoba (1968)
Zoku onna no keisatsu (1969)
Yakuza wataridori: Akutôkagyô (1969)
Onna banchô - jîngi yaburi (1969)
Bakuto mujô (1969)
Nagurikomi Shimizu Minato (1970)
The Vampire Doll (1970) - Nonomura's Employee Genzô
Sympathy for the Underdog (1971)
Lake of Dracula (1971) - Kyûsaku
Hyakuman-nin no dai-gasshô (1972) - Inspector Kurosumi
Daitokai Series (1976-1979, TV drama) - Yonezo maruyama
Mahjong hōrōki (1984) - Deme Toku
Aitsu ni Koishite (1987) - Kinzō Matsumae
Saraba itoshiki hito yo (1987) - Minoru Nitta
Machibugyo Nikki (1987)
Dokuganryū Masamune (1987 Taiga drama)
Hana no Furu Gogo (1989)
Kagerô (1991) - Takeshu
Kojika monogatari (1991) - Yoshio Sakaguchi
Chi ko monogatari nezumi kozo no tsukuri kata seikimatsu-ban (1991)
Kowagaru hitobito (1994) - Master of liquor maker (final film role)

References

1919 births
1994 deaths
People from Asahi, Chiba
Actors from Chiba Prefecture
20th-century Japanese male actors